Vicki Nelson-Dunbar (born September 25, 1962) is a former professional tennis player from the United States. During her career she won one top-level singles title (at São Paulo in 1986), and reached the fourth round of the US Open in 1982.

Nelson-Dunbar holds the record for participating in the longest women's tennis match against Jean Hepner which lasted six hours and 31 minutes. This match also featured the longest rally in tennis history, a 643-shot rally that lasted 29 minutes. The game occurred on September 24, 1984, at a tournament in Richmond, Virginia.

WTA Tour finals

Singles (1  win, 1 loss)

See also
 Longest tennis match records

References

External links 
 
 

1962 births
Living people
American female tennis players
People from Wooster, Ohio
21st-century American women